Buu Nygren (born December 25, 1986) is the 10th President of the Navajo Nation. Nygren-Montoya received 34,890 votes, defeating the Nez-Abeyta campaign who received 31,339 votes in the 2022 election. He was sworn in on January 10, 2023, his first political office.

Nygren was born on December 25, 1986, in Blanding, Utah. He is of half Navajo and half Southern Vietnamese descent. Nygren is Táchiiʼnii clan born for Vietnamese. He attended Red Mesa High School. Nygren was the running mate of Joe Shirley Jr. in the 2018 Navajo Nation presidential election. At 35 years of age, Nygren is the youngest person to have ever been elected President of the Navajo Nation.

Nygren has worked in construction management. He is married to former Arizona state representative Jasmine Blackwater-Nygren.

References

External links
 Navajo Nation Office of the President and Vice President

1986 births
21st-century Native American politicians
American politicians of Vietnamese descent
Living people
Native American people from Arizona
People from San Juan County, Utah
Presidents of the Navajo Nation